Claude-François Lizarde de Radonvilliers (1709, Decize, Nièvre – 20 April 1789) was a French churchman and teacher.

In 1763, Lizarde de Radonvilliers was elected to the Académie française. From 1770 until his death, he was commendatory abbot of Villeneuve Abbey near Nantes, then in Brittany.

External links
Académie française

1709 births
1789 deaths
People from Nièvre